Cicerone Field at Anteater Ballpark is the ballpark at the University of California, Irvine in Irvine, California, United States.  It is the home stadium of the UC Irvine Anteaters baseball team. Opened in 2002, the stadium has 908 seats and can accommodate up to an additional 2,500 people on a grass berm.

In 2009, the ballpark's field was named for Ralph J. Cicerone, the university's chancellor from 1998 to 2005.

See also
 List of NCAA Division I baseball venues

References

External links

UC Irvine Anteaters baseball
College baseball venues in the United States
Baseball venues in California
2002 establishments in California
Sports venues completed in 2002
Sports venues in Irvine, California
University of California, Irvine main campus buildings and structures